The major professional sports leagues in the United States and Canada commonly refer to the highest men's professional competitions of team sports in those countries. The four leagues traditionally included in the definition are Major League Baseball (MLB), the National Basketball Association (NBA), the National Football League (NFL), and the National Hockey League (NHL). Other prominent leagues include Major League Soccer (MLS) and the Canadian Football League (CFL).

MLB, NBA, NFL, and NHL are commonly referred to as the "Big Four." Each of these is the wealthiest professional club competition in its sport worldwide, and along with the English Premier League they make up the top five sports leagues by revenue in the world. In addition, the sports of these four leagues were all developed in their modern forms in North America, and all except American football have become popular internationally. Because the leagues enjoy a significant place in popular culture in the U.S. and Canada, the best players from these leagues often become cultural icons in both countries.

Each of the Big Four leagues, as well as Major League Soccer and the Canadian Football League, averages at least 15,000 fans in attendance per game as of 2018. The two indoor leagues, the NHL and NBA, play in arenas that average under 19,000 seats, resulting in the CFL holding the third highest average attendance of the six leagues, at close to 24,000 per game, after the NFL and MLB.

The Big Four leagues currently have 30–32 teams each, most of which are concentrated in the most populous metropolitan areas of the United States and Canada. Unlike the promotion and relegation systems used in sports leagues in various other regions around the world, North American sports leagues are closed leagues that maintain the same teams from season-to-season. Expansion of the league usually occurs by adding newly formed teams, though mergers with competing leagues have also occurred. Teams do not leave the league unless they are disbanded (which has not happened since 1954) or merged with another team (which has not happened since 1978). Relocation can change the name of a team, but it is generally still considered to be the same entity.

Baseball, American football, and ice hockey have had professional leagues continuously for over 100 years; early leagues such as the National Association of Professional Base Ball Players, the Ohio League, and the National Hockey Association formed the basis of the modern MLB, NFL, and NHL, respectively. Basketball was invented in 1891, and its first professional league formed in the 1920s. The Basketball Association of America, founded in 1946, formed the basis of the NBA in 1949 and has lasted for over 75 years.

Soccer (or association football) was first professionalized in 1894, but leagues suffered greatly from lack of sustainability and seldom lasted more than a decade. The sport's greatest successes were in the form of the American Soccer League (1921–1933), the original North American Soccer League (1968–1984) or NASL, and, currently, Major League Soccer (1996–present). MLS is the seventh highest attended professional soccer league worldwide.

The term "major league" is usually limited to professional team sports. Individual professional sports competitions such as PGA Tour golf and NASCAR Cup Series auto racing are also very popular and serve as those sports' most prominent competitions with levels of media coverage, competition, and fan following comparable to the major professional team sports. Amateur competitions such as college football and college basketball, at the upper echelons, also enjoy strong media coverage and fan followings but are generally recognized as inferior to the major professional leagues in level of play because of the inherent limits of the amateur sports system.

"Big Four" leagues

Major League Baseball
Major League Baseball is the highest level of play of baseball in North America and the world, and the oldest of the major American leagues. It consists of the National League (founded in 1876) and the American League (founded in 1901). With the establishment of the American League in 1901 also came the trademarking of "Major League Baseball". Cooperation between the two leagues began in 1903 inasmuch as the two league champions began playing a "World Series". In 1904, however, there was no World Series played because one of the league champions refused to play. During the offseason, the owners of each league voted to have the league champions automatically play one another in the World Series and it would be 90 years before another World Series was not played, in 1994, due to a work stoppage. The two leagues merged on an organizational level in 2000 with the elimination of separate league offices; they have shared a single Commissioner since 1920. There are currently 30 member teams, with 29 located in the U.S. and 1 in Canada. Traditionally called the "National Pastime", baseball was the first professional team sport in the U.S.

National Basketball Association
The National Basketball Association is the premier basketball league in the world, and the youngest of the major American leagues. It was founded as the Basketball Association of America in 1946, and adopted its current name in 1949, when the BAA merged with the rival National Basketball League. Four teams from the rival American Basketball Association joined the NBA with the ABA–NBA merger in 1976. It currently has 30 teams, 29 in the United States and 1 in Canada. The NBA is watched by audiences both domestically and internationally. It is the most popular league of the four worldwide.

National Football League
The National Football League is a professional American football league and was founded in 1920 as a combination of various teams from regional leagues such as the Ohio League, the New York Pro Football League, and the Chicago circuit as a successor to Western Pennsylvania Professional Football Circuit. For its first two seasons, 1920 and 1921, it was known as the "American Professional Football Association" (APFA) before changing its name to the current name in 1922. The NFL partially absorbed the All-America Football Conference in 1949 and merged with the American Football League in 1970. It has 32 teams, all located in the United States. NFL games are the most attended of domestic professional leagues in the world in terms of per-game attendance, and the most popular in the U.S. in terms of television ratings and merchandising. Its championship game, the Super Bowl, is the most watched annual event on U.S. television, with Super Bowl XLIX being the single most-watched program in U.S. television history. The NFL is the only one of the major leagues not to have a presence in Canada, where the Canadian Football League (see below) is the premier professional league in a similar but not identical gridiron football sport of Canadian football.

National Hockey League
The National Hockey League is the premier professional ice hockey league in the world, and it is the only one of the four major leagues to have been founded in Canada. It was formed in 1917 as a successor to the Canadian National Hockey Association (founded in 1909), taking all but one of the NHA's teams. The NHL partially absorbed the rival World Hockey Association in 1979. There are 32 teams, with 25 in the U.S. and 7 in Canada. The most popular sports league in Canada, and widely followed across the northern and northeastern U.S., the NHL has expanded westward and southward in recent decades to attempt to gain a more national following in the United States, in cities such as Denver, San Jose, Dallas, Miami, Nashville, Phoenix, Raleigh, Tampa, Las Vegas, and Seattle with varying success. Ice hockey still remains much more popular in the northern states of the U.S. closer to Canada, such as the Upper Midwest, New England and the mid-Atlantic States of New Jersey, New York (the New York Metropolitan area has 3 NHL teams compared to 2 for each of the other 3 leagues) and Pennsylvania, than in the rest of the United States. The NHL has more Canadian teams (seven) than MLB, the NBA, and Major League Soccer combined (five).

Other notable professional leagues

Nate Silver of the ESPN-owned website FiveThirtyEight has argued that there is a case to be made for the inclusion of Major League Soccer and the Canadian Football League in the major professional sports leagues of North America.

Major League Soccer
Major League Soccer (MLS) is the top-level men's professional soccer league in the United States. As of the league's ongoing 2023 season, MLS has 29 teams, with 26 in the United States and 3 in Canada. The league began play in 1996, its creation a requirement by FIFA for awarding the United States the right to host the 1994 World Cup. MLS was the first major Division I outdoor soccer league in the U.S. since the North American Soccer League (NASL) operated from 1968 to 1984. MLS has increased in popularity following the adoption of the Designated Player Rule in 2007, which allowed MLS to sign stars such as David Beckham and Thierry Henry. In 2017, MLS reported an average attendance of 22,112 per game, with total attendance exceeding 8.2 million overall, both breaking previous MLS attendance records, while 2018 saw Atlanta United FC break multiple single-game attendance records, with crowd figures of over 70,000 among the highest team attendances worldwide.
With an average attendance of over 20,000 per game, MLS has the third-highest average attendance of any sports league in the U.S. after the NFL and MLB, fourth-highest in North America after the NFL, MLB, and CFL, and is the seventh-highest attended professional soccer league worldwide. The Canadian Soccer Association does not sanction MLS as a first-division league, with that title going instead to the Canadian Premier League (CPL). However, MLS is generally acknowledged as having a higher quality of play than the CPL, significantly more media coverage and economic success, and has teams based in Canada's three largest metropolitan areas.

Canadian Football League
The Canadian Football League is the highest level of play in Canadian football. The league was organized in 1956 as a cooperative agreement between two regional leagues, the Interprovincial Rugby Football Union (which dated to 1907) and the Western Interprovincial Football Union (which was founded in 1936), and became independent from the Canadian Rugby Union in 1958. The league now consists of nine teams, all based in Canada. The Grey Cup is awarded annually to the champion every November and is the highest-attended sporting event in the nation. The oldest extant teams, the Hamilton Tiger-Cats and the Toronto Argonauts, trace their origins to the late 1860s and early 1870s, which ranks them amongst the oldest professional sports teams of any kind still in existence on the continent. From 1993 to 1995, the CFL attempted expansion into the United States to cities without NFL teams, but all the clubs folded, while the management structure of the Baltimore Stallions was moved to a relaunched Montreal Alouettes franchise. The CFL is the second-most-popular league in Canada, after the NHL. It has the third-highest average attendance of the northern North American leagues, behind the NFL and MLB; in 2010 the average attendance was 26,781, with a total attendance of 1,928,225.

Traits of these major leagues

Overview
Major professional sports leagues are distinguished from other sports leagues in terms of business and economic factors, popularity of the league, and quality of play. The following table compares the Big Four leagues, plus CFL and the MLS, on certain attributes that collectively attempt to indicate whether the league has "major league" status.  The table includes the longevity and stability of the league, as measured by the year founded, the last time the league underwent expansion and contraction, the number of teams in the league, and the popularity of the league, as measured by annual revenues and average attendance.

Revenues

The top four major leagues each have revenues that can be many times greater than the payrolls of less popular sports leagues in the two nations. In terms of overall league revenue, the NFL, MLB and the NBA rank as the top three most lucrative sports leagues in the world, with the English Premier League and the NHL ranked at fourth and fifth place.

Television exposure

The major sports leagues have their games televised on the Big Four U.S. broadcast TV networks—ABC, CBS, NBC, and Fox—enjoy strong TV viewer ratings, and earn significant revenues from these TV contracts.
All of the top four major sports leagues have had television contracts with at least one of the original "big three" U.S. broadcast television networks (ABC, CBS, and NBC) since those networks' early years, indicative of the sports' widespread appeal since their inception, continuing today additionally with Fox. In Canada, the NHL has been broadcast on the Canadian Broadcasting Corporation since 1952. In Canada, there is only one MLB team and one NBA team, and no Canadian NFL team exists; therefore, the U.S. national telecasts for those three leagues are usually simulcast by a Canadian broadcaster.

The NFL has the largest TV contracts, and earns over $6 billion annually from its contracts with Fox, CBS, NBC, ESPN and DirecTV for the 2014 through 2022 seasons.
MLB earns $1.5 billion annually from its contracts for the 2014 through 2021 seasons with ESPN, Fox, and Turner Sports (TBS).

The NBA's nine-year television deal beginning with the 2016–17 season with ABC/ESPN and TNT generates annual league TV revenues of $2.7 billion. The NHL's current U.S. television deal with ABC/ESPN and Turner Sports took effect with the 2021–22 season and runs through 2027–28; while the NHL did not announce the amount, outside reports indicated that Disney (parent of ABC and ESPN) was paying about $400 million and Turner about $225 million annually. This $625m annual contract for American rights is in addition to the $433m annual fee Rogers Sportsnet pays for Canadian rights.

All four major sports leagues have launched a network of their own—NBA TV in the U.S. in 1999 and in Canada in 2001, the NFL Network in 2003, the NHL Network in Canada in 2001 and in the U.S. in 2007, and the MLB Network in 2009. All networks remain in operation today except for the Canadian NHL Network, which was shut down shortly before the league's 2015–16 season.

Teams in the MLB, NBA, and NHL—which play several days per week—negotiate contracts with local broadcasters to air most of their games, both terrestrial networks and regional sports networks. Some teams (such as the New York Yankees) may even partially or fully own the cable network upon which their games are broadcast, and often receive more revenue from local broadcasts than any other source. NFL teams, which generally play once per week, do not negotiate local broadcast contracts, but are allowed to negotiate their own television deals for preseason games with syndication and broadcast stations.

The most recent broadcast deals for MLS take effect with the 2023 season. The league's primary media partner will be Apple, which paid a reported $2.5 billion for exclusive worldwide streaming rights from 2023–2032. All league games will be streamed on the Apple TV app. English and Spanish commentary will be available for all matches, and games involving Canadian teams will also be available in French. Linear television rights for 2023–2026 are held by Fox Sports in both English and Spanish in the US, and the English-language TSN and French-language RDS in Canada.

Before the Apple TV deal, MLS matches were shown in English on ESPN and Fox Sports, and in Spanish on Univision. MLS's eight-year contracts for U.S. rights for the 2015–2022 seasons earned a combined $105 million annually.

The CFL's current television deal with ESPN and its Canadian counterparts, TSN and RDS, pays the CFL at least $50 million per year for both Canadian and American rights.

Attendance
Major professional sports leagues generally have significantly higher average attendance than other sports leagues.  The following table shows the average attendance of all professional sports leagues in the United States and Canada that have an average attendance of 15,000 or higher. The table uses seasons played in 2019 or earlier because COVID-19 pandemic restrictions significantly reduced capacity for many games in seasons starting in 2020 or later.

Franchise valuations

Major-league franchises are generally worth very large amounts of money, due in large part to high revenues earned by the league's teams. These franchise valuations are reflected in periodic analyses of teams' values, as well as by the expansion fees commanded by the leagues. The highest value franchises in the respective leagues tend to be located in the largest markets (e.g., MLB's New York Yankees, NHL's New York Rangers), whereas the lowest value franchises tend to be in smaller markets (e.g., NFL's Buffalo Bills, NBA's New Orleans Pelicans). The NHL has the largest multiples between the highest-value and lowest-value teams, with the New York Rangers worth 5.5 times as much as the Arizona Coyotes.

Recent expansion franchises have commanded huge entry fees, which represent the price the new team must pay to gain its share of the existing teams' often guaranteed revenue streams. The Houston Texans paid $700 million to join the NFL in 2002. By comparison, the Charlotte Bobcats (now the Hornets) paid $300 million to join the NBA. The Arizona Diamondbacks and Tampa Bay Rays (originally Devil Rays) paid $130 million each to join MLB. The most recent NHL entry, the Seattle Kraken (which started play in 2021), paid $650 million to join the league, a 30% increase from the $500 million paid by the Vegas Golden Knights to join the league in 2017. The Golden Knights' fee was a dramatic increase from the $80 million paid by each of the previous two teams to enter the NHL, the Columbus Blue Jackets and Minnesota Wild. Two of the six most recently announced Major League Soccer expansion teams, 2019 entrant FC Cincinnati and 2020 arrival Nashville SC, each paid a $150 million expansion fee, a significant increase from the $100 million that New York City FC paid to join MLS in 2015. MLS has since announced plans to expand to 30 teams by 2023, and set the expansion fee for the 28th and 29th teams (ultimately Sacramento Republic FC and St. Louis City SC) at $200 million. The 30th team, ultimately unveiled as 2022 entry Charlotte FC, reportedly paid $325 million. For comparison, the Ottawa Redblacks paid C$7 million to join the Canadian Football League.

Franchise stability

All of the top four major leagues exhibit stability in most of their franchises.  No team from the top four leagues has collapsed outright since the 1970s. The last team to cease operations was the NHL's Cleveland Barons in 1978, when financial pressures forced a merger with the Minnesota North Stars. MLB voted in 2001 to contract from 30 teams to 28, but ran into opposition and never executed the contraction plan. Unlike many leagues in other countries which use a system of promotion and relegation, franchises in these leagues are stable, and do not change annually.

Relocation of teams is generally uncommon compared to minor leagues. However, all of the top four major leagues have had at least one franchise relocate to another city since 2004. Among the Big Four leagues, the NFL has had the highest number of recent relocations, relocating three teams over the course of the late 2010s. The NHL is the most recent to expand, having added the Las Vegas-based Vegas Golden Knights in 2017 and the Seattle Kraken in 2021 (none of the other Big Four leagues have added expansion teams since 2004).

Since 2005, in contrast to the Big Four leagues, MLS has operated on a policy of continuous expansion; after bottoming out at 10 teams in 2004, it has never gone more than one season without adding one or two expansion teams, with further expansion teams already scheduled through 2023 and no indication that the league will cease awarding expansion teams. By 2023, MLS will have nearly tripled in size from its 2005 minimum, with 29 teams. The league has contracted three teams in its history: teams in Miami and Tampa Bay folded in 2002, and the Los Angeles-based Chivas USA squad folded in 2014. MLS has had one franchise relocate, the San Jose Earthquakes, which became the Houston Dynamo in 2006; the Earthquakes returned as an expansion club in 2008, inheriting the pre-relocation history of the original Earthquakes.

All seven CFL franchises between Vancouver and Toronto have been in place since the BC Lions were founded in 1954. The league has had problems in the two markets east of Toronto; both Montreal and Ottawa have each seen two CFL teams fail since the 1980s, although both cities have active teams as of the 2014 season (the cities are now represented by the Alouettes and Redblacks, respectively). Among existing teams, none has ever formally relocated from one city to another; the Alouettes, however, inherited a management structure from the Baltimore Stallions, a team from the league's unsuccessful 1990s-era South Division. The CFL has had either eight or nine teams in operation since its inception except for the 1994 and 1995 seasons in which the league temporarily expanded into the United States.

In the fifty years between 1903 and 1953, MLB experienced no franchise changes (no new franchises, no franchises ceasing operations, and no franchises moving), the longest such period of stability of any Big Four league.

Number and locations of franchises

Each of the Big Four leagues has at least 30 teams (the NFL has had 32 teams since 2002 and the NHL added its 32nd team in 2021), and each has had at least 29 teams since the year 2000. Major League Soccer has 28 teams; it adopted a policy of continuous expansion at a rate of one to two new franchises a year since 2005, and was set to reach its long-range target of 30 teams in 2023 before the Sacramento expansion bid was placed on hold. The CFL has nine franchises, with a tenth team potentially joining in the early 2020s.

All of the top four major leagues grant some sort of territorial exclusivity to their owners, precluding the addition of another team in the same area unless the current team's owners consent, which is generally obtained in exchange for compensation, residual rights, or both. Regarding territorial rights, the main concern for many team owners is television revenue, although the possibility of reduced ticket sales remains a concern for some teams. Because the NFL shares all of its television revenue equally, and most of its teams sell out their stadiums, some NFL owners are seen as less reluctant to share their territories. For example, the return of the NFL to Baltimore in 1996 attracted no serious opposition from the Washington Redskins organization.

As of 2022, 49 metropolitan areas (42 in the U.S., seven in Canada) have at least one team in the Big Four leagues. Austin FC, which started play in 2021, is the first and only MLS team in a market not also occupied by at least one Big Four team. The CFL has one team, the Saskatchewan Roughriders, in a market not served by any other major league (the Hamilton Tiger-Cats, while having their city to themselves, are on the outskirts of both the Buffalo-Niagara Region and the extended Greater Toronto Area). The newest market any of the Big Four leagues have entered is the Las Vegas Valley, which received the Vegas Golden Knights in 2017 and the Las Vegas Raiders in 2020.

United States
Major leagues have franchises placed nationwide, with multiple franchises in each of the United States' four census regions—Northeast, Midwest, South, and West.

Major leagues tend to place franchises only in the largest, most populated metropolitan areas. Most major league teams are in metro areas having populations over two million. All but seven continental U.S. metropolitan areas over one million people host at least one major sports franchise. All five U.S.-based major leagues each currently have at least two teams in both the New York/North Jersey area and the Los Angeles/Anaheim market. MLB, which historically (as a result of its history as two rival leagues) had a team in each component league in Boston, Philadelphia and St. Louis up until the mid-20th century, still has AL and NL teams in Chicago and the San Francisco Bay Area. 13 American metropolitan areas have a complete set of one or more teams in each of the Big Four leagues; 11 of those 13 also have teams in MLS.

MLB, more than any other major league, focuses its teams in the largest markets. MLB is the only major league that does not have any teams in markets with fewer than 1.75 million people; both it and the NFL have teams in every U.S. market with over 4 million people. The NHL is the major league that least follows the general trend, due to the fact that a disproportionate number of its franchises are in cities with cold winters. The NHL lacks teams in a number of southern metropolitan areas with populations of over 3 million (Houston, Atlanta, San Diego) but has five teams in northern metropolitan areas with fewer than 1.25 million people, all of which are in or adjacent to Canada (the lone American team in a metro area of that size being the Buffalo Sabres). While only one MLB team, the San Diego Padres, is located in a market that has no other major league teams, seven NBA teams are located in cities devoid of any additional "Big Four" franchises: Memphis Grizzlies, Oklahoma City Thunder, Orlando Magic, Portland Trail Blazers, Sacramento Kings, San Antonio Spurs and Utah Jazz (Salt Lake City). Four of these seven NBA-only cities also lack an MLS team (Memphis, Oklahoma City, Sacramento, San Antonio; Sacramento was scheduled to become home to an MLS team in 2023, but this move has since been placed on hold).

The NFL has one major exception. The Green Bay Packers survive in major league sports' smallest metropolitan area (300,000 population) thanks to a unique community ownership, proximity to the neighboring Milwaukee market (giving a combined metro area of over two million), a league business model that relies more heavily on equally-distributed television revenue that puts small-market teams at less of a disadvantage, and the loyalty of their Cheesehead fan base. The only Packers home games that have failed to sell out since 1960 were games during the 1987 players' strike that were played with replacement players; neither the Packers nor the NFL consider those games to have interrupted the team's ongoing streak of sellouts. Green Bay is one of two NFL teams, the other being the Jacksonville Jaguars, that are the only major league franchises in their metropolitan area.

Both MLB and the NFL have had two prolonged recent exceptions in which the league was absent from one of the U.S.'s ten most populous metropolitan areas; from 1972 to 2004, ninth-place Washington, D.C. had no MLB team, and from 1995 to 2016, second-place Los Angeles had no NFL teams.

The NHL's national footprint is a relatively recent situation. Historically, the league was concentrated in the northeast, with no teams south of New York City or west of Chicago from 1935 until 1967. The league expanded its footprint westward in a 1967 expansion but, other than the unsuccessful Atlanta Flames, avoided the South until making a major expansion into the territory in the 1990s.

Both the NBA and MLS have higher concentrations of teams in the western United States than the other major leagues. Whereas the NBA's teams tend to be somewhat more evenly distributed across the United States, MLS's presence in areas of the southern United States has historically been sparse; after MLS folded its two Florida-based teams after the 2001 season, it did not re-enter the South until Orlando City SC joined the league in 2015, with Atlanta United FC following in 2017. With the addition of Minnesota United FC in 2017 and Inter Miami CF in 2020, MLS remains absent from two markets with an otherwise complete set of the Big Four leagues: Detroit and Phoenix.

The CFL had a total of six teams in the United States over a three-year period between 1993 and 1995, all in medium-sized markets that lacked an NFL team at the time; of the seven markets those teams occupied, three (Baltimore, San Antonio and Sacramento) had other major league franchises at the time, and two would later receive a major team (Memphis and Las Vegas). The league also played occasional games in the United States in the 1950s and 1960s.

The largest metropolitan area without a major professional sports franchise depends on the definition of "metropolitan area". Among areas defined by the United States Census Bureau as Metropolitan Statistical Areas (MSAs), California's Inland Empire is the largest without a major franchise. However, it is part of Greater Los Angeles, a region defined by the US Census as a Combined Statistical Area (CSA), and is thus part of the Los Angeles television market. The largest CSA without a major franchise is the Hampton Roads area of southeastern Virginia, spilling over into a small part of North Carolina. The largest TV market without a major franchise is the Hartford–New Haven market, covering all of Connecticut except Fairfield County (the state's closest to New York City); Hartford's last major league squad, the NHL's Whalers, left in 1997.

Canada

The NHL has been the dominant professional sports league in Canada, and was first established in Canada in 1917.  
The NHL was initially based entirely in eastern Canada; by 1925, Hamilton and Quebec City no longer had NHL teams, while Ottawa would leave in 1934, by which point American teams were slowly being added. The first Canadian expansion team would come in 1970 with a team in Vancouver; the NHL later added teams in Edmonton, Winnipeg and Quebec City (through absorption of WHA franchises), Calgary (via relocation from Atlanta) and Ottawa (via expansion) to go with the still-extant Toronto and Montreal teams. The distinctive place hockey holds in Canadian culture allowed these franchises to compete with teams in larger cities for some time. However, the teams in Winnipeg and Quebec City were eventually moved to larger media markets in the U.S. The NHL returned to Winnipeg in 2011 with the Atlanta Thrashers relocating to become the current version of the Winnipeg Jets. Excluding the CFL, the NHL is the only major league to have teams in Edmonton, Calgary, Winnipeg or Ottawa, all markets with fewer than 1.25 million, smaller than any U.S. NHL market except Buffalo. However, those Canadian cities benefit from the country's very high level of hockey fandom. A 2013 study by Nate Silver estimated that all of these markets had roughly the same numbers of avid hockey fans as U.S. markets with several times their total population.

The Canadian Football League has teams in all seven current NHL markets, in addition to Hamilton, Ontario, and Regina, Saskatchewan. At least eight of these nine markets have hosted CFL teams every year since the league's officially listed inception in 1958, and no other Canadian market has ever had a CFL team of its own. In 2015, the CFL commenced Northern Kickoff, originally slated to be one preseason game and later expanded to a regular season game as well, both of which were played in Fort McMurray, an oil sands boomtown with a metro area population of less than 70,000, the smallest market to host major professional football in the modern era. Fort McMurray is in relatively close proximity to Edmonton, which was expected to boost attendance, but fewer than 5,000 fans attended the regular season game, and no games have been held in the city since. Regular season games have been played in Moncton in 2010, 2011, 2013 and 2019 to gauge expansion to the Maritime provinces in the Touchdown Atlantic; the expansion team, the Atlantic Schooners, has been proposed twice, once unsuccessfully in the 1980s, and another in the late 2010s that is still being considered. Hamilton, in addition to hosting the 2013 Touchdown Atlantic, played the rest of their 2013 season in Guelph during the construction of Tim Hortons Field.

The first Major League Baseball team in Canada was the Montreal Expos, who began play in 1969. In 2005, they moved to Washington, D.C. and became the Washington Nationals. The Toronto Blue Jays, who began play in 1977, became the first team outside the United States to win the World Series in 1992 and 1993.

The NBA expanded into Canada in 1995 when the Vancouver Grizzlies and the Raptors joined the league. The Grizzlies moved to Memphis in 2001.

MLS has teams in Vancouver, Toronto, and Montreal.

The NFL is the only major league to have no team based in a Canadian city; the closest teams to Canada are the Buffalo Bills and Detroit Lions, both representing cities located on the U.S.–Canada border. The Lions play in downtown Detroit,  from Windsor, Ontario. From 2008 to 2013, the Bills played 8 games in Toronto as part of the Bills Toronto Series which included one regular season game per year. On August 22, 2019, the Oakland Raiders played the Green Bay Packers in a preseason game at IG Field in Winnipeg.

Ownership restrictions

All four major leagues have strict rules regarding who may own a team, and also place some restrictions on what other sort of activities the owners may engage in. 
The major leagues generally do not allow anyone to own a stake in more than one franchise, to prevent the perception of being in a conflict of interest. This rule was adopted after several high-profile controversies involving ownership of multiple baseball teams in the 1890s. Additionally, the NHL's "Original Six" period, from 1942 to 1967, was marked by the Norris family owning a controlling stake in half of the league's teams, a factor in the league's stagnation during that period.

With the exception of the NFL, every other major league has had at least one case since 2000 where the league itself has taken ownership or control of a franchise:
 MLB — Purchased the Montreal Expos in 2001 and moved the franchise to Washington, D.C. as the Nationals in 2005 before selling the team to a local group in 2006. MLB also took over the operations of the Los Angeles Dodgers in 2011, citing financial and governance issues stemming from the divorce of the team's co-owners, before Frank McCourt sold the Dodgers to an ownership group in March 2012.
 NHL — Took over the Buffalo Sabres in 2002 after owner John Rigas was arrested for embezzlement, and sold the team to Tom Golisano in 2003. The NHL also seized the Phoenix Coyotes in 2009 to prevent its owner from selling it to a buyer who intended to relocate the team, and sold the team to a Phoenix-area group in 2013.
 NBA — Purchased the New Orleans Hornets from its owner in December 2010, and sold the team to owner Tom Benson in April 2012. 
 MLS — Purchased Chivas USA from Jorge Vergara in 2014 and folded the team after the 2014 season. A new L.A. franchise, Los Angeles FC, began play in 2018 as an expansion team and did not inherit Chivas USA's history.
 CFL — Seized the Ottawa Renegades from owner Bernard Glieberman in 2006, suspended the franchise, then sold it to Jeff Hunt, who reactivated it in 2014 as the Ottawa Redblacks. The CFL also accepted ownership in 2019 of the Montreal Alouettes from owner Robert Wetenhall in order to keep it operating until the league announced Sid Spiegel and Gary Stern as the team's new owners in January 2020. The CFL again assumed ownership of the Alouettes in 2023 following Spiegel's death.

The NFL (nor any of its predecessors) has not taken over operations of any team since 1962, when the American Football League took over the nearly bankrupt Titans of New York in an effort to prevent the team from folding; in 1963, a new ownership group bought the franchise and it became the New York Jets.

The NFL has stronger ownership restrictions than other leagues. The NFL forbids ownership by groups of over 24 people or publicly-traded corporations, except the grandfathered Green Bay Packers. Additionally, the league requires that at least one member of the ownership group hold a 30% interest, with stringent limits on the amount of debt that a new ownership group can take on. The NFL also forbids its owners from owning any other professional American football teams; this rule has not always been in place (as the NFL owners previously owned minor league teams in the 1940s) but was in place by the 1980s, when the DeBartolo family was scrutinized for owning both the San Francisco 49ers and USFL's Pittsburgh Maulers (as different members of the family owned each team, the league allowed the DeBartolos to keep the 49ers). Arena Football League teams playing in the NFL team's home market were exempt from this rule during that league's existence. NFL owners were long prohibited from owning major league baseball, basketball and hockey teams unless they were in the NFL team's home market, or not located in other NFL cities. This last set of restrictions was lifted in October 2018; many owners believed that cross-ownership restrictions had outlived their purpose, and they had largely been disregarded since Stan Kroenke, who purchased the then-St. Louis Rams and moved them to Los Angeles while simultaneously owning assets in Denver, became a majority NFL owner in 2010. Additionally, media reports theorized that the cross-ownership ban materially reduced the sale price of the Carolina Panthers earlier in 2018, with several NBA team owners reportedly interested in bidding but barred by then-current NFL rules. The cross-ownership restrictions originally covered soccer, but a 1982 federal court decision in a lawsuit filed against the NFL by the original NASL went in favor of the NASL, thereby exempting soccer from these restrictions.

MLS has adopted a different league structure and operates as a single-entity league, a structure that survived a lawsuit from the players in Fraser v. Major League Soccer. During the first few years of the league, MLS for the sake of stability allowed individuals to operate multiple teams. MLS ownership arrangements have evolved, however; each of the league's current 29 teams is now controlled by a separate ownership group, and no group member has a stake in more than one team.

Seven out of nine clubs in the CFL are held by some form of partnership or corporation; of those seven, two (Saskatchewan and Edmonton) are publicly held corporations in and of themselves, two (Toronto and Hamilton) are partially owned by public conglomerates, and three (Calgary, Ottawa and Montreal) are held by closely held partnerships. Only one, the BC Lions, is held by an individual owner. The ninth team, the Winnipeg Blue Bombers, operates under the shell of the Winnipeg Football Club, a nonprofit sports club with no clear ownership structure or share capital.

Challenges from rival leagues

All of the majors have bested at least one rival league formed with the intention of being just as "big" as the established league, often by signing away star players and by locating franchises in cities that were already part of the existing league. In many cases, the major leagues have absorbed the most successful franchises from their failing rivals, or merged outright with them.

Baseball's National League withstood three challenges in its first quarter century of existence. The American Association began in 1882 in several lucrative markets without an NL team. For several years, the AA was a viable competitor to the NL, and the NL and AA champions competed in an informal World Series. Four of the AA's teams defected to the NL in its later years, before the AA expired in 1891. Labor problems led to the formation of the Players' League for the 1890 season; it attracted a significant percentage of the baseball talent and caused the NL and AA significant financial harm, but it lacked financial backing and folded after only one season. The minor Western League moved several franchises in NL cities and cities abandoned by the NL for the 1900 and 1901 seasons, and renamed itself the American League in direct competition with the NL. The NL and AL made peace in 1903; the resulting agreement formed what today is known as Major League Baseball. MLB withstood the challenge of the Federal League in 1914. Various Negro leagues peaked from the 1920s to the 1940s, and on barnstorming tours the Negro league players showed themselves to be MLB players' competitive equals, but after Jackie Robinson broke the color barrier in 1947, the influx of black stars into the major leagues drained the Negro leagues of talent. MLB prevented the Continental League from getting off the ground in 1961–62 by placing teams in four of that league's proposed cities by either expansion or relocation.

The NFL has fought off the most rivals throughout the years, and to this day faces a competing start-up league every few years. One strong rival to the NFL was the All-America Football Conference of 1946–1949; three of their seven teams merged with the NFL for the 1950 season, and two of the three still exist in the NFL. Four (all unrelated) rivals were named American Football League; the last American Football League existed from 1960 to 1970, winning the last two of the four pre-merger Super Bowl games, before merging with the NFL in 1970. The NFL has beaten back other significant rival football leagues, often placing expansion or relocation teams in those cities following that league's demise: the World Football League of 1974–1975 (the NFL added two teams in 1975), the United States Football League of 1983–1985 (the NFL relocated one team to a USFL market in 1988), and the Canadian Football League's American franchises of 1993–1995 (the NFL added three teams in the mid 1990s, including one in the CFL's most successful U.S. market). All told, 13 of the NFL's current 32 franchises were absorbed from a rival league—all 10 AFL franchises of the 1960s, two from the AAFC, and one from the 1936 AFL.

The NBA was formed in 1949 after three years of competition between the large-market Basketball Association of America (from which the NBA traces its existence) and the industrial-based National Basketball League.  The NBA also had to fend off two incarnations of the American Basketball League, the first being an Eastern circuit that predated the NBA, and the second existing from 1961 to 1963, after Abe Saperstein was repeatedly denied an NBA expansion team. The NBA later fought off the challenge of the American Basketball Association from 1967 to 1976, in part by expanding from nine to eighteen teams. The NBA then absorbed four of the ABA's most successful franchises in a 1976 merger, and adopted several of the ABA's rule variations, most notably the three-point shot.

The NHL began its existence competing with the Western Canada Hockey League and its predecessor, the Pacific Coast Hockey Association; both had folded by 1926, leaving the NHL as the sole major North American hockey league. The NHL fended off two challenges in the 1960s and 1970s. The NHL prevented the old Western Hockey League from achieving parity in the quality of players, salaries and attendance by doubling in size from six to twelve teams in 1967, including into the WHL markets of Los Angeles and San Francisco, and added two more teams in 1970, including a former WHL team in Vancouver. During its existence from 1972 to 1979, the World Hockey Association challenged the dominance of the NHL. The WHA initially attracted stars by offering higher salaries than the NHL and successfully invalidating the NHL's reserve clause, forcing NHL teams to keep up. The bidding war brought financial distress to both leagues. With the WHA and several NHL teams faced with collapse, the NHL negotiated a merger of the leagues whereby the four strongest WHA teams joined the NHL.

The CFL has been historically protected from the competing leagues that the NFL faced, in part because of threats of parliamentary legislation to stop any CFL competitor from being allowed to play in Canada. The Canadian Football Act, proposed in 1974 but never passed, would have given the CFL a government-endorsed monopoly on professional gridiron football in Canada by prohibiting any other league from playing its games in the country; the mere introduction of the bill in Parliament prompted the WFL's Toronto Northmen to move to the United States before playing a single game and later the first USFL was discouraged from establishing teams in Canada with the threat to reintroduce the Act in 1982.  In the context of the modern North American sports market as a whole, however, CFL has faced and survived numerous challenges from upstart US-based leagues seeking to establish themselves as a second-tier gridiron football league relative to the NFL and thus competing with the CFL for player talent and consumer exposure. The vast majority of these leagues (such as the first USFL, UFL, XFL and its later reincarnation, and AAF) have all been short-lived; all but the current XFL and the second USFL (which started play in 2022) have folded, with the current XFL resuming play in 2023 after a reorganization. Similarly, the CFL itself played the role of a competitor to the NFL during its mid-1990s expansion out of Canada and into the US market, which was also short lived.

Fixed league membership

In general, sports leagues in the United States and Canada are closed leagues that never developed any system of promotion and relegation like those in Europe. A major professional sports team stays at the top level of the sport, regardless of their performance.

A major factor in this development was the greater distances between cities, with some teams separated by at least half the continent, which in turn resulted in higher traveling costs. When the National League of Professional Base Ball Clubs was established in 1876, its founders judged that in order to prosper, they must make baseball's highest level of competition a "closed shop", with a strict limit on the number of teams, and with each member having exclusive local rights. This guarantee of a place in the league year after year would permit each club owner to monopolize fan bases in their respective exclusive territories and give them the confidence to invest in infrastructure, such as improved ballparks. This in turn would guarantee the revenues needed to support traveling across the continent. With the introduction of TV exposure and other sources of increased revenue during the 20th century, team owners have no incentive to risk giving up this annual income in favor of establishing an "open shop system" where they could be relegated to a lower league that does not generate that kind of lucrative money. There has been discussion of Major League Soccer adopting promotion and relegation, but MLS is not pursuing the option. Eight current MLS teams—Seattle Sounders FC, Portland Timbers, Vancouver Whitecaps FC, CF Montréal, Orlando City SC, Minnesota United FC, FC Cincinnati, and Nashville SC—were promoted from lower leagues through the traditional expansion process, without regard to on-pitch record; instead new teams are brought into MLS based on the financial strength of their ownership and market. Sacramento Republic FC was scheduled to become the ninth such MLS team in 2023 until its lead investor pulled out of the expansion deal.

Player development

All of the major North American professional sports leagues use a draft system to assign prospective players to teams. The NFL, NHL and NBA all use their respective drafts to ensure a certain measure of parity between franchises, so that teams with losing records pick early in the draft, while the league champions pick last in each round. (In the NFL, the relationship is directly linear, so that the worst team always gets the first overall pick; the NHL and NBA, in efforts to thwart tanking, use a draft lottery to determine the early draft order.)
Three of the top four major leagues possess sophisticated player development systems.

The vast majority of MLB players are developed through the minor league baseball system. Prospective players generally are drafted, and are then assigned to the appropriate minor league level for development. With the growth of college baseball, more players opt to play at the collegiate level and delay entry into the MLB draft; college baseball players with professional aspirations will usually also play collegiate summer baseball to gain experience and exposure while maintaining their college eligibility. Individual teams' large scouting staffs have given way to smaller staffs and subscriptions to commercial player scouting services. Entering the majors directly from high school or college is rare, and most of the few that have were quickly reassigned to the minors. MLB clubs also sign many players from Latin American countries, and have also recruited many players from the Japanese leagues.

Most of the NBA's talent comes from college and high school basketball, although minimum age rules have ended the NBA's practice of drafting players directly from high school beginning in 2006. The NBA's developmental league, now known as the G League, was implemented in 2001 by the NBA to perform the role of a farm system in helping with player development and market reach, but NBA teams more frequently recruit talent from overseas professional leagues, mostly in Europe with a few players being recruited from leagues in Latin America, China, and Australia.  Prior to the development of the G League, the Continental Basketball Association had served as a minor league to the NBA.

The National Football League is the only one of the four major sports leagues that does not have a formalized farm system. The source for almost all NFL players is college football, but NFL also has International Player Pathway Program for potential international prospects. Drafted players from college immediately join the main team; if they fail to make the regular season roster, a limited number of players may be assigned to the practice squad. NFL teams rarely recruit players from other gridiron football leagues.  American football also has the least global reach for prospects, with one exception being several players from other codes of football primarily as kickers and punters.  The league's teams backed the World League (later known as NFL Europe) in the 1990s and 2000s, and purchased teams in the Arena Football League for a period in the 2000s. As of 2019, the National Football League Players Association explicitly opposes having an official minor league in the same model as the other major sports, mainly because of the risk of injury.

Each NHL team has an affiliate in North America's top-tier minor hockey league, the American Hockey League, and most have an affiliation with teams in the ECHL. For decades, the traditional route to the NHL has been through junior hockey and the Canadian Hockey League (CHL). Beginning in the 1970s, NHL teams began drafting and signing prospects from Europe, and a growing number of NHL hopefuls are forgoing the CHL in favor of NCAA Division I college hockey. Additionally, USA Hockey also sanctions junior hockey leagues, such as the United States Hockey League and North American Hockey League, that allow players to develop while also retain NCAA eligibility in order to make the NHL. Almost all draft picks are initially assigned to an affiliate in their NHL team's minor league system for development.

MLS teams sign players from their youth academies, from the MLS college draft, and from overseas. MLS teams rely on their youth academies, which are now a requirement for all MLS clubs. MLS clubs can operate youth teams as young as 13–14 years old. Some youth academy teams participate in lower-tier leagues. MLS also holds an annual draft in which top college soccer players are selected. MLS has in the recent past had a formal relationship with the United Soccer League, which operates (among other leagues) the Division II USL Championship (USLC) and Division III USL League One (USL 1). For several years in the 2010s, MLS teams were nominally required to field a reserve team in a USL league, either by direct ownership or affiliation with a separately owned team, although this requirement was never strictly enforced. MLS relaunched its reserve league in 2022 as MLS Next Pro, a third-level league featuring 20 MLS reserve teams and one independently owned team (Rochester New York FC). Of the nine current and future MLS teams that did not field a side in Next Pro's first season, all but CF Montréal and D.C. United will field reserve sides in Next Pro in 2023. This setup allows developing MLS players to gain playing experience.

The CFL's draft is limited to Canadian citizens, plus non-citizens who were raised in Canada. In addition to university/college football, the CFL draft also draws players from the long-established Canadian Junior Football League and its component leagues. The league also draws from the same pool of free agents as the NFL, with players who do not make the NFL often going north to seek work in the CFL. The CFL requires free agents to sign contracts, and thus stay in the league, for a minimum of two years. Unique to the CFL is the concept of the negotiation list, which allows CFL teams to unilaterally declare exclusive rights to any given player. Described as an "enduring mystery," the negotiation list forces players to accept the offer they are given, usually at league minimum, with no leverage to negotiate with other teams; there is no order or limits to the negotiation list, and teams can add or remove players to a 45-position negotiation list without their permission and at any time, regardless of age. Since 2018, ten of the 45 players must be publicly announced.

High player salaries

The average annual salary for players in the four major leagues is about US$2.9 million in 2008, although player salaries can range from $500,000 for backup players to as much as $40 million (up to around $60 mil in the NFL and the NBA by 2021, not counting endorsements and sponsorship deals) for superstars.

NFL, MLB, and NBA, have the biggest and longest contracts in the history of professional sports.

NBA players have the highest average player salaries of the four leagues; however, their teams also have the smallest rosters.

The NFL has the highest average team payroll.  However, NFL rosters are far larger (55 players) than the other three leagues (many players on NFL rosters see little actual game play), and teams play far fewer games, making their players on average the lowest paid of the Big Four major leagues. After a brief lockout during the 2011 off-season, the owners and union signed a new CBA that imposed a hard salary cap of $120 million in the 2011 season, but temporarily suspended the salary floor, which returned in the 2013 season at 89% of the cap.

MLB is now alone among the major leagues in that it lacks any form of a salary cap and has enacted only modest forms of revenue sharing and luxury taxes. Compared to the other leagues, there is a far greater disparity between MLB payrolls. The New York Yankees had the highest payroll of any American sports team in 2006 when they paid $194 million in players' salaries – nearly twice the NFL salary cap and nearly thirteen times the payroll of the Florida Marlins who spent about $15 million (significantly less than the mandatory minimum team payrolls in the NFL and NHL).

For the 2010–11 NHL season, the average player salary was slightly above the pre-lockout level of US$1.8 million. In the same season, the league's salary cap was US$59.4 million per team, with the salary floor set at US$16 million under the cap.

MLS has lower average salaries and smaller payrolls than the other leagues. MLS kept a strict rein on player salaries until 2007, when MLS introduced the Designated Player Rule, which allows MLS teams to pay higher wages for star players. David Beckham was the first player signed under this rule. The highest MLS payroll in 2019 was Toronto FC, with $24.5 million. The league's average salary is about $423,232 per year.  MLS' minimum player salary will increase from $63,542 to $85,502 for most players.

The CFL has a relatively smaller annual player salary and salary cap compared to the other leagues. The average salary in 2018 is $113,000 and the salary cap in 2018 is CAD $5.2 million. As recently as the 1990s, loopholes in the salary cap allowed CFL teams to pay select marquee players a salary comparable to their NFL counterparts, but financial problems forced the league to close those loopholes. Starting quarterbacks, typically the highest paid players on a CFL roster, can make as much as CAD $750,000.

Dominance of the sport
Each of the top four major leagues are the premier competitions of their respective sport on the world stage. Major League Baseball is increasingly luring away the stars from the Japanese leagues, the European hockey leagues have become a major source of star talent for National Hockey League clubs, and the National Basketball Association frequently recruits talent from professional leagues in Europe, Latin America, Australia and China.

All four leagues are considered to be the top league in their respective sports, not only in revenue, but also in quality of talent, player salaries, and worldwide interest. However, of the four major leagues, the NFL has the least presence outside both countries; it is mainly an American and Canadian interest. Basketball is a strong spectator and participation sport in parts of the world, and the NBA is unquestionably the top basketball league. Hockey (Europe) and baseball (East Asia, Latin America, Caribbean) have loyal followings in some of the world's other regions as well. Selling league broadcasting rights to foreign markets is another way for the leagues to generate revenue, and all the leagues have tried to exploit revenue streams outside of their home market.

The NHL is the top professional hockey league in the world, and the NHL attracts top players from European leagues. The NHL played exhibition games against European teams in the "NHL Premiere" series (2007–11), the NHL Challenge (2000–10), and the Victoria Cup (2008–09), and NHL teams have won 24 games to the European teams' four.

Major League Soccer is not the premier soccer competition in the world, or even in the Americas, in terms of competition success, revenues, and players. MLS teams compete with top teams from North America, Central America and the Caribbean in the CONCACAF Champions League; before Seattle Sounders FC won in 2022, every edition since the current format was introduced in the 2008–09 season was won by a Mexican club. MLS has annual revenues of 1.2 billion,  the Big five European soccer leagues (England, Germany, Spain, Italy, and France) have annual revenues in excess of $1 billion as well. The top players from MLS often move to Europe in search of tougher competition and higher salaries. However, MLS has steadily improved in international stature in recent years. The league implemented the Designated Player Rule in 2007, allowing MLS to attract and retain international stars such as David Beckham. MLS attendance has increased to the point where MLS average attendance is among the top ten soccer leagues worldwide. The introduction of soccer-specific stadiums had improved revenue growth.

In the late 1940s and 1950s, the Canadian Football League (CFL) and the U.S. National Football League (NFL) operated on roughly equal footing financially, with even some U.S.-born star players joining CFL teams. The situation changed along with the rise of the American Football League (AFL) founded in 1959. By the end of the 1960s, revenue from the U.S. television market and absorption of the AFL helped the NFL become much more successful than its Canadian counterpart. By the 1980s, the CFL became virtually unknown outside of Canada. Attempts to promote the CFL included the failed CFL USA experiment in the 1990s. In 2009, a record number of 6.1 million viewers watched the CFL's annual Grey Cup championship game, while 151.6 million viewers watched the NFL's annual Super Bowl championship game that same year.

Use of the phrase "world champions"
The perceived lack of competition from the rest of the world has contributed to the long-standing but controversial practice of the North American media referring to the major sports league champions as world champions. Today, the phrase is more popular in the United States but it retains some acceptance in Canada. However, this practice is usually mocked by non-Americans.

Usage of the phrase in baseball started with organization of championship series between the National League and the earlier American Association in the 1880s, later to be known as the World Series. Major League Baseball later set up the World Baseball Classic, a quadrennial international competition, in an effort to crown a true world champion. By the 1950s, the phrase World Champions was also being used by the newly formed NBA. The Super Bowl, the interleague championship between the NFL and American Football League, was explicitly named a "World Championship Game" for its first iteration.

In hockey, the Stanley Cup was initially open only to Canadian teams, but in 1914, the Cup's trustees allowed American teams to compete, with the provision that the Stanley Cup winners were to be recognized as World's Champions. The phrase was repeatedly engraved on the Cup, and continued to be used, when the NHL began admitting American franchises. When the NHL assumed formal control of the Cup in 1947, the resulting agreement required "that the winners of this trophy shall be the acknowledged World's Professional Hockey Champions" (in contrast to the IIHF's Ice Hockey World Championships, at the time nominally contested by amateurs, although Eastern Bloc nations violated the rules and used de facto professionals). When the World Hockey Association commenced play in the 1970s, they sought to challenge for the Stanley Cup, referring to the 1947 agreement. Both the NHL and the Cup trustees rejected the WHA's challenges; nevertheless, the NHL stopped calling its champions the World Champions, as by this time, the Soviet Championship League was regularly beating the NHL in interleague competitions and the IIHF World Championship was officially opened up to professionals in 1976. Since then, the NHL has called their champions the Stanley Cup Champions.

Holiday showcases
Several major sports leagues are showcased on a major holiday. The NFL has always played on Thanksgiving Day since its inception in 1920. The NBA has played on Christmas Day since 1947. And since 2008, the NHL has had the Winter Classic on New Year's Day. Furthermore, the CFL has two longstanding holiday events: the Labour Day Classic and Thanksgiving Day Classic.

Baseball and soccer are not particularly associated with any holidays; however, in baseball's case, teams generally play on the major summer holidays since MLB teams play almost every day during their season, and currently themes special uniforms and ceremonies for Memorial Day, Canada Day (for the Toronto Blue Jays), American Independence Day, and the American/Canadian Labor Day.

History and expansion of major leagues

United States

Professional sports leagues as known today evolved during the decades between the Civil War and World War II, when the railroad was the main means of intercity transportation. As a result, virtually all major league teams were concentrated in the northeastern quarter of the United States, within roughly the radius of a day-long train ride, within the Great Lakes and the Northeast regions. Early professional soccer activity was concentrated almost entirely on an East Coast corridor from Baltimore to Boston, except for the St. Louis metropolitan area.

There were very few major league teams in the far west until after World War II. As travel and settlement patterns changed, so did the geography of professional sports. The NFL attempted to establish traveling teams representing the west and other far-flung regions in 1926 and barnstormed in Los Angeles that season; the experiment did not last beyond that year. The first west coast major-league franchise was the NFL's Los Angeles Rams, who moved from Cleveland in 1946. The same year, the All-America Football Conference began play, with teams in Los Angeles and San Francisco, and the Miami Seahawks. Baseball  extended west in 1958 in the move of the Brooklyn Dodgers and New York Giants. The NBA followed in 1960 with the move of the Minneapolis Lakers to Los Angeles, while the NHL would not have a west coast presence until it expanded in 1967. Almost all of the NHL's initial franchises in the Southern and Western United States were unsuccessful and relocated. From 1982 until 1991, the Kings were the only U.S.-based NHL franchise south of St. Louis and/or west of the Twin Cities. Since then, as newer, fast-growing Sunbelt areas such as Phoenix, Tampa, and Dallas became prominent, the major sports leagues have expanded or franchises have relocated to service these communities.

Canada
The National Hockey League was established in 1917 in Canada. When the WHA and NHL merged, the NHL inherited teams in three Canadian cities, Edmonton, Winnipeg and Quebec City. MLB's first Canadian team was the Montreal Expos, a team that was added in 1969; MLB added the Toronto Blue Jays in 1977. MLS's first was Toronto FC, which was added in 2005; it was soon followed by the Montreal Impact and Vancouver Whitecaps. The Toronto Huskies were a charter member of the Basketball Association of America in 1946, but that team only lasted one season; the NBA would then make a permanent expansion into Canada in 1995 when the Toronto Raptors and now-departed Vancouver Grizzlies were established.

International expansion
Some of the Big Four sports leagues have looked to expand their revenues by playing overseas games in attempt to develop a wider international fan base. There has been increasing cooperation between the NBA and the Euroleague. In 2005, the two bodies agreed to organize a summer competition known as the NBA Europe Live Tour featuring four NBA teams and four Euroleague clubs, with the first competition taking place in 2006. The NBA has also played teams from Australia's National Basketball League, and since 2015, the league has played all-star games in the Johannesburg, South Africa, area against squads composed of NBA players who were either born on or whose parents were born on the African continent.

The NFL has attempted to promote its game worldwide by scheduling selected pre-season games abroad since 1976. The NFL had promoted the game abroad through NFL Europe, but the latter was unprofitable and ceased operations in 2007.
The NFL began its International Series, holding at least one regular-season game at Wembley Stadium in London every year since 2007. The NFL held three games at Wembley in the 2014 season. Since then, Twickenham Stadium, the home of English rugby union, has been added as a second London venue. The primary venue for London NFL games is set to switch to Tottenham Hotspur Stadium, opened in 2019 by the soccer club of that name. The new stadium hosted two of the four London games in the 2019 season. The current contract between the NFL and The Football Association, owners of Wembley Stadium, will expire after the 2020 season, while the NFL has a contract with Tottenham Hotspur (aka Spurs) for games through 2027. The Spurs stadium, in which the NFL made a modest investment, is designed to be capable of hosting both forms of football on a single weekend if necessary.

The CFL, under commissioner Randy Ambrosie, began actively recruiting gridiron players from Mexico and Europe as part of its "CFL 2.0" initiative in 2019.

Relations between leagues
Although they are competitors, at times the "Big Four" leagues also cooperate. Some owners have teams in multiple leagues. In the early years of professional basketball, the American Basketball League, the de facto major league of the 1920s, was backed primarily by NFL owners.
There are common business and legal interests; the leagues will often support one another in legal matters since the courts' decisions might establish precedents that affect them all. One recent example was the Supreme Court decision in 2010 in American Needle, Inc. v. National Football League, in which the NFL (which ultimately lost the case) received amicus curiae briefs from the NBA, NHL, and MLS. The leagues' commissioners occasionally meet in person, most recently in 2009.

The leagues also cooperate in the construction and use of facilities. Many NBA and NHL teams share arenas, and, in years past, such sharing was very common for MLB and NFL teams. Multi-purpose stadiums were built to accommodate multiple sports in the later half of the 20th century; the last multi-purpose stadium in the NFL, what is now Rickey Henderson Field at RingCentral Coliseum, hosted its last NFL game in 2019. Even in situations where separate stadiums have been constructed for each team (as is generally the norm in the 21st century), the individual stadiums may be constructed adjacent to each other and share parking space and other infrastructure. More recently, MLS teams have used NFL and CFL stadiums as either full-time home fields (much less so now, due to the league's insistence on soccer-specific stadiums) or for special event games; in reverse, in at least one case, an NFL team (the Los Angeles Chargers) used a soccer-specific MLS stadium on a temporary basis from 2017 to 2019 while a larger stadium was built for them. In recent years, two MLS teams have shared stadiums permanently with NFL teams that were explicitly built to host both sports. The Seattle Sounders share Lumen Field with the Seattle Seahawks; the Seahawks were owned by Paul Allen, also a member of the Sounders ownership group, until his death in 2018. Atlanta United FC shares Mercedes-Benz Stadium with the Atlanta Falcons, with both teams under the ownership of Arthur Blank. Charlotte FC shares Bank of America Stadium with the Carolina Panthers; both teams are owned by David Tepper. In Canada, Vancouver Whitecaps FC share BC Place with the CFL's BC Lions. The Seattle, Atlanta, and Vancouver stadiums are designed to have reduced seating capacity for most MLS games. Charlotte's stadium was renovated to allow for lower capacity soccer crowds before the MLS team debuted in 2022. Additionally, the New England Revolution shares Gillette Stadium with the New England Patriots, New York City FC shares Yankee Stadium with the New York Yankees MLB team, which also owns part of NYCFC, and Toronto FC shares BMO Field with the CFL's Toronto Argonauts, with both teams now owned by the company that also owns Toronto's NBA and NHL teams.

Also notable in recent years have been the NHL's Winter Classic and Heritage Classic, which have been held in NFL, CFL, and MLB, as well as college football, stadiums. A unique situation is the TD Place Complex in Ottawa; the same structure serves as the indoor Ottawa Civic Centre (which hosted the NHL's Senators in the 1990s), while on the roof of that arena was seating for Frank Clair Stadium (at that time home of the CFL's Ottawa Rough Riders; by 2014 the stadium was renovated into TD Place Stadium and is now home to the CFL's Ottawa Redblacks).

In the early years of the NFL and to a lesser extent the NHL, it was not uncommon for teams to share nicknames with their MLB counterparts. For example, until 1957 New York City played host to baseball and football Giants. MLB's Pittsburgh Pirates shared its nickname with an NFL team (which ultimately became the Pittsburgh Steelers) as well as a now-defunct early NHL team, while the Canadian football team Hamilton Tigers shared a team name with an NHL team. The most recent example of two major teams sharing a franchise name was between 1960 and 1987; when the NFL's Chicago Cardinals relocated to St. Louis, Missouri, it was allowed to keep the Cardinals name despite the established existence of a baseball team of the same name.

In 1997, the NFL loaned $3 million to the CFL after the latter's failed expansion into the United States market in the early 1990s left it in financial danger.

In 2015, the NHL partnered with MLB's digital arm Major League Baseball Advanced Media (MLBAM) to assume the operations of its digital properties; the league's television network NHL Network was also taken over by the staff of MLB Network and re-located to its facilities.

The NBA Finals of the NBA and the Stanley Cup Finals of the NHL are the championship series of their respective leagues, which occur in June. Oftentimes, there is partial overlap between the two series and in such cases their game days are staggered so as not to interfere with each other.

See also

 Professional sports leagues in the United States
 Prominent women's sports leagues in the United States and Canada
 Major professional sports teams of the United States and Canada
 List of shared franchise names in North American professional sports
 Sports in the United States
 Sports in Canada
 Sports in Mexico
 List of American and Canadian cities by number of major professional sports franchises
 List of professional sports leagues
 List of attendance figures at domestic professional sports leagues – a summary of total and average attendances for the major sports leagues from around the world.
 List of professional sports leagues by revenue

Footnotes

References

External links
North American Pro Sports Teams – Lists every league that has operated in Canada and / or the United States. Grouped by city.
USA Today Salary Database – Lists and sorts team payroll by year for all teams in MLB, NFL, NBA, NHL, and Major League Soccer.

^
^